Scott Unrein (born November 13, 1976) is an American composer and performer of electronic and acoustic music.

History

Early life and education
Unrein was born in Portland, Oregon, United States. He was raised in Salem, Oregon, and attended South Salem High School graduating in 1995.

He attended University of Puget Sound where he studied music and theatre. He then attended University of Oregon graduating with a master's in composition. In 2004, Unrein moved to Kansas City, MO where he attended school at the University of Missouri and pursued a doctorate in composition. While there, he taught music at University of Missouri and Kansas City Kansas Community College.

Career
His pieces, often for small groups and unusual instrument combinations are slow and quiet, using modular cells of process-driven music.  He uses a modified western graphic notation to create ambiguous and complex counterpoint between instruments and instrument groups.  Often included under the category of postminimalist and ambient West Coast-based composers, composer and music critic Kyle Gann compared his music favorably to composer Harold Budd.

From 2006 to 2011, he produced and hosted a podcast, NonPop, a radio-like program (74 total episodes) covering new music and new releases of studio albums.

He has released several albums of music and has announced upcoming projects for film and television.

Discography

Solo
 A Rising Space, (2018) redbirdsong workshop
 down the sky they sing, (2020) redbirdsong workshop

collaborations
 The Putney Cascade on The Putney Project, Vol. 1, (2012) Irritable Hedgehog Music
 Nacre on Nat Evans: The Tortoise, (2015) independent release

Film work

Television

References

External links
 Official website
 IMDb
 NonPop blog
 Composer/Alum David McIntire Releases New CD on His Record Label, "Irritable Hedgehog"
 28th Annual New Music & Art Festival, featured composer
 Associate Artist in Residence @ The Atlantic Center for the Arts
 Stocking Stuffers from Planet Eugene
 21st Century Music -- September 2000, Volume 7, Number 9 "Leading the Oregon Cheer for New Music. 26."

1976 births
Living people
American male classical composers
American classical composers
Minimalist composers
Postminimalist composers
Ambient musicians
21st-century classical composers
21st-century American composers
21st-century American male musicians